Mount Mabu is a mountain in northern Mozambique, famous for its  old-growth rain forest. While well known locally, the Mount Mabu forest and its extremely diverse wildlife were unknown to plant and animal scientists until 2005. It was visited after browsing Google Earth in 2005 by a team of scientists from the Mulanje Mountain Conservation Trust (MMCT) and several ornithologists, and later in 2008 by scientists from Kew Royal Botanic Gardens; by browsing Google Earth's satellite view to look for potential unknown wildlife hotspots in Africa. It is frequently referred to as the "Google Forest".

Habitations
There are communities living around Mount Mabu, the closest being Nangaze, Nvava, and Limbue. The mountain plays a crucial role in the lives of the communities, and in the cosmology of the Nangaze leader, Mount Mabu belongs to a kinship network in which Mabu is the oldest brother, Mount Muriba is the youngest brother and River Mugue is the middle sister. Local narratives state that the first leaders of the Nvava or the Nangaze community after they died their spirits flew to the mountain. This is the reason why each one of these communities claim legitimate belonging to Mount Mabu. The communities resort to the mountain for protection, animal protein, smallholding, foraging, and traditional ceremonies – mucutu in the present. These activities have generated a wealth of local knowledge about the Mountain that is yet to be explored in association with the growing interest on Mabu. In their cosmology Mount Mabu is a moral subject that needs to be respected.

Currently, there are two Mozambican NGOs working with the communities to turn Mount Mabu into a conservation area, namely, Justica Ambiental and RADEZA. These NGOs created associations to protect Mount Mabu in different communities. JA created associations in Nangaze, Nvava, Namadoe and Limbue. RADEZA created committees of natural resources management in the four communities mentioned and six more. RADEZA in association with ITC (Iniciativa de Terras Privadas) persuaded the government to provide community land titles – DUAT. Until, the present there is no formal conservation of Mabu. However, the associations "control" access to the mountain and forest.

Species 
Among 126 species of birds identified, there are seven new populations of globally threatened species of birds in the forest, including the Thyolo alethe, whose other populations are all threatened by logging and deforestation. Others include Swynnerton's robin and Namuli apalis.

Several new species have been discovered in the Mount Mabu forest. The isolation of the rain forest, surrounded by savannah, makes it likely that it is host to many previously undiscovered species. Named species so far include:
Helixanthera schizocalyx, a tropical mistletoe in the family Loranthaceae.
Nadzikambia baylissi, a chameleon. It is only the second species in what was previously a monotypic genus, Nadzikambia.
Rhinolophus mabuensis, The Mount Mabu horseshoe bat.
Atheris mabuensis, a bush viper.
Dipsadoboa montisilva, a tree snake.
Rhampholeon maspictus, a pygmy chameleon.
Cymothoe baylissi, a butterfly.
Epamera malaikae, a butterfly.
Leptomyrina congdoni, a butterfly.

There are likely many more new species in the forest, with likely candidates so far including a shrew, a pseudo-scorpion, frogs, snails, bats, catfish, and various insects.

Conservation
In June 2009, the Mozambique government announced that they would establish conservation measures to prevent commercial logging. The Mabu forest is believed to be the largest medium-altitude rain forest in Africa. African forests that are unspoiled by logging and other human activity are rare. The Mount Mabu forest is surrounded by areas devastated by the Mozambican Civil War (1977–1992). Poor road access, and its use as a refuge for local villagers during the war all contributed to its protection. No records of previous expeditions or collecting trips have been discovered.

See also
Afromontane
Mount Lico

References

External links
 
 
 
 
 
 
 
 

Mabu
Mabu
Lugela District
Mabu
Mabu
Important Bird Areas of Mozambique